The Makira flycatcher (Myiagra cervinicauda) is a species of bird in the family Monarchidae. It is endemic to Solomon Islands. Its natural habitat is subtropical or tropical moist lowland forests. It is threatened by habitat loss.

Alternate names for the Makira flycatcher include Makira Myiagra, ochre-headed flycatcher, ochre-tailed flycatcher, red-tailed flycatcher, San Cristobal flycatcher and San Cristobal Myiagra flycatcher.

References 

Makira flycatcher
Birds of Makira
Makira flycatcher
Taxa named by Henry Baker Tristram
Taxonomy articles created by Polbot